Three Logan Square, formerly the Bell Atlantic Tower, is a 55-story skyscraper located in Philadelphia, Pennsylvania. Standing 739 ft (225 m) tall to its structural top, the building encloses  of office space. The building, designed by the Philadelphia-based architecture firm Kling Lindquist, was completed in 1991.

A landscaped plaza, constructed of the same red granite as the building, occupies the rest of the plot, fulfilling a city requirement that 1% of the total budget for new building construction must go toward a work of public art.

A banquet hall, known as Top of the Tower, occupies the top floor of the building and is available for public rentals.

It was the headquarters for Philadelphia-based Baby Bell Bell Atlantic until 1996, when Bell Atlantic acquired New York City-based NYNEX and moved its headquarters to New York. In 2000, Bell Atlantic and GTE merged to become Verizon and the "Bell Atlantic" name became obsolete. However, the building's managers kept the original name, mainly because of the difficulties in getting all necessary parties to agree to change it.

The building had been offered for sale in the past, and on August 5, 2010, it was sold to Brandywine Realty Trust. The company has since renamed the tower Three Logan Square, to better identify its location near two other Brandywine-owned buildings, One and Two Logan Square.

Tenants
 CDI Corporation
 Comcast Cable
 Reed Smith
 Excelacom Inc
 Janney Montgomery Scott, LLC
 Warner Bros. Digital Labs
 Kleinbard
 Verizon
 Marsh & McLennan Companies
 L2P

See also

List of tallest buildings in Philadelphia
List of tallest buildings in Pennsylvania
List of tallest buildings in the United States
List of skyscrapers
List of towers

External links

Top of the Tower
Listing at Emporis

References

Skyscraper office buildings in Philadelphia
Verizon Communications
Center City, Philadelphia
1991 establishments in Pennsylvania
Office buildings completed in 1991